Start Stadium may refer to:

Start Stadium (Saransk), stadium in Saransk, Republic of Mordovia, Russia
Start Stadium (Nizhny Novgorod), stadium in Nizhny Novgorod, Russia